"The Three Sisters" or Green Meadow (Italian: Verde Prato) is an Italian literary fairy tale written by Giambattista Basile in his 1634 work, the Pentamerone.

Synopsis

A woman had three daughters; the two older were very unlucky but the youngest, Nella, was very fortunate.  A prince married her and hid her from his wicked mother, visiting her in secret.  She could throw a powder in a fire, and he would come to her on a crystal road.  Her sisters discovered this and broke the road, so that the prince was injured when he was coming to her.

He was dying.  His father proclaimed that whoever cured him would marry him, if female, or have half the kingdom, if male.

Nella heard of it and set out.  Hiding in a tree, she overheard an ogre tell his wife about the illness, and how only the fat from their bodies could cure the prince.  She climbed down and presented herself at their door as a beggar.  The ogre, greedy of her flesh, persuaded his wife to let her stay.  When they slept, Nella killed them and took their fat.  She brought it to the king and cured the prince.  He said he could not marry her because he was married already; Nella asked if he wanted to be married to the person responsible, and the prince blamed her sisters.  Nella revealed herself as his wife.  Her sisters were thrown in an oven.

Analysis
The tale is classified in the international Aarne-Thompson-Uther Index as type ATU 432, "The Prince as Bird". Scholars Jack Zipes and D. L. Ashliman list the tale as a literary predecessor of the tale type.

Variants

Italy
Author Rachel Harriette Busk collected a tale from Rome with the title Il Vaso di Persa or The Pot of Marjoram: a rich merchant has three daughters. One day, he is ready to go to the market and asks his daughters what they want when he returns. The elder asks for shawls woven with golden threads, the middle one for coverlets of bird plumage, and the youngest asks for a simple pot of majoram. The merchant travels abroad and finds his elders' gifts, but cannot find the flower pot. During his journey home, a strange-looking man accosts the merchant and offers him the flower pot, for a hefty price of three hundred thousand scudi. The merchant buys it. When he returns home, he gives his daughters the presents, and the youngest takes the flower pot to her room, shutting herself for quite some time. The elder sisters learn of the cost of the present to their cadette, and, spurred by jealousy, decide to destroy the pot. They convince their father to have their sister join him for walk, so she can leave the room. It happens thus and, while the girl is away, the sisters take the pot of marjoram and throw it out of the window, the pot shattering in pieces. When the girl returns, she discovers her sisters' deed and decides to leave home. She wanders off until she meets a "fairy" (Busk's translation for the original "fata"), who gives her male clothings and provisions for the road. She continues her travels and finds herself in a dense forest, and climbs a tree to rest. Some time later, a couple of bears stop by the same tree and begins to talk. The girl overhears their conversation (thanks to the fairy's powers): the bears discuss how the king of Persia fell out of the window of a high tower, broke his bones and has glass shards embedded on him, and how the only cure is fat from their bodies, that is to be melted with honey and wax, and to remove the glass he needs to be bathed in warm water. The girl kills the bears and takes their fat, melts them with honey and wax (also given by the fairy) and goes to Persia to cure the king. She cures the king by following the bears' instructions and spends some time in the king's palace. The king takes her as his queen.

Asia

Iraq
In an Iraqi folktale, collected by E. S. Drower with the title The Crystal Ship, a merchant has to travel and asks his daughters what presents he can buy them. The youngest, as per her mother's suggestion, asks for "clusters-of-pearl". Travelling abroad, the merchant finds out that "clusters-of-pearl" is the name of "the son of the Sultan of the Jānn". He meets the prince, who gives the merchant a box with three hairs, to be given to his third daughter. The merchant returns home and gives the box to his youngest daughter, and builds a room to allow her encounters with the prince. She uses the three hairs to summon the prince and over the threshold, a lake appears, on it a ship of crystal with the prince. The prince advises her that, if anything should happen to him, for her to seek him out in iron shoes and with an iron staff. One day, the girl's sisters goad her into taking a bath with them and, while she is distracted, the eldest sister goes to her room. She finds the box and rubs the three hairs: the prince comes on the crystal ship and she, scared by the sight, screams. The ship breaks apart into splinters and some of them injure the prince. The ship and the lake disappear. Later on the same night, the girl tries to summon the prince by rubbing the hairs, but he does not appear and she suspects something afoul. She follows his instructions, and begins a quest wearing iron shoes and walking with an iron staff. She stops by a tree and overhear two doves (cucūkhtiain) talking about the prince's illness and the only cure for him: the doves' own blood and feathers, and some of the leaves of the very tree they are perched on. The girl kills the doves and prepares the cure, then goes to the city of Jânns to cure the prince.

Turkey
The eldest daughter asks for a diamond earring; the middle one for a diamond pin, and the youngest for "Green Pearl", cursing her father not to return until he finds it. The merchant goes on his trip and finds his elder daughters' requests, but cannot finds the youngest's. When he embarks on his ship, it cannot move, and the merchant goes back to the market to ask again for "Green Pearl". A Jewish man answers that "Green Pearl" is the name of the son of the padishah of Yemen. The merchant goes to Green Pearl's court and explains the situation to him. The prince answers he cannot accompany the merchant back to his homeland, but gives him three boxes. One day, the third daughter takes the boxes to an empty square and opens the first two: from the first a palace appears, and from the second 40 servants that guide the girl to the palace. The next day, she opens the third box; a crystal bridge appears to her, with a rider coming to her. It is Green Pearl. The servants welcome him to the palace and he spends time with the girl. At one time, he warns her never to close the box while he is on the crystal bridge, lest he dies. Some time later, the girl's sisters decide to visit her. While the girl is taking a bath, one of her sisters enters her room and sees the three boxes, one closed and two opened. She opens the closed one and closes the open ones. The girl exits the bath and discovers that someone touched the boxes. She tries to summon Green Pearl again, but only the bridge appears, with no one on it. She lets the boxes open and finds a tree at the end of a trail, where two birds are talking. They converse about how to cure prince Green Pearl: the fat from the neck (oil from the hair, in Margery Kent's translation) of a Dew that sits under the tree. The girl overhears their conversation, kills the Dew and goes to Green Pearl's kingdom as a Jewish seller. Once there, she announces she has a cure for the prince, which she uses on him, and asks for her payment his ring and prayer beads. After curing him, she goes back to the square and opens the boxes to summon him. Green Pearl appears on a horse, sword in hand and poised to strike her, but she shows him the ring and the prayer beads, and he understands she was the one that cured him.

Iran 
In an Iranian tale titled The "Pink Pearl" Prince, a merchant lives in Persia with his three daughters, Razia, Fawzia and Nazneen. One day, he has to go to Mecca on pilgrimage, and his daughters ask him to bring presents: Razia asks for diamond earrings, Fawzia for a diamond hairpin and Nazneen for a pink pearl, and curses her father not to return until he brings it. The merchant goes to Mecca and finds the earrings and the hairpin, but, having no luck in getting it, decides to embark on the ship with the other pilgrims. The ship does not move, and the other pilgrims notice it. The merchant disembarks and goes to look for the "pink pearl", who he learns is the name of the local king's son. Prince Pink Pearl tells the merchant he cannot go with him back to Persia, but gives him three boxes. The merchant returns home and gives the presents to his elder daughters, shows the boxes to Nazneen, and expels her from home for the troubles her request caused him. Nazneen takes the boxes with her and goes to an empty lot. She opens the first box and a palace appears to her. Next, she opens the second box and maidservants appear to welcome her to the palace. Nazneen spends some time in the palace, and decides to open the third box: a bridge appears before her with a prince on it. Prince Pink Pealr comes to her and explains she cannot close the third box while he is on the bridge, lest he dies. Pink Pearl and Nazneen fall in love with each other. Meanwhile, Razia and Fawzia decide to seek their sister. After they walk for a day, they reach a palace (their sister's) and are welcomed inside. Razia and Fawzia go to take a bath after their long journey, and Fawzia enters Nazneen's quarters. She peers into the third box and, seeing nothing, closes it. Razia and Fawzia return home with gifts. Nazneen goes to wait for the prince, but he never returns. Sensing something wrong, she goes back to her room and sees the closed box. Nazneen rushes out of her palace and wander off, until she stops to rest under a tree. Two birds perch on the tree and talk about the cure for the prince: the oil of the hair of the demon that sits near the tree. Nazneen kills the demon and, disguising herself as a doctor, goes to Pink Pearl's kingdom and cures him. She asks for the royal ring as her payment, and goes back to her palace. She opens the third box and Pink Pearl appears again. He sees the ring on her finger, and realizes she was the one that cured him.

Africa

Morocco 
In a Moroccan variant collected by Jilali El Koudia with the title The Sultan's Daughter, a sultan has three daughters, the youngest he loves best and grants all her wishes. The elder two become jealous of their father's attention, so the princess asks for her own palace to be built where she could live alone. The son of a neighbouring sultan learns of this and becomes interested in this princess. They contact each other, but the princess will only allow presential meetings with her by providing her with a hundred of anything she asks for, as well as by digging a tunnel beneath her palace to allow further meetings. They meet in secret, but rumours of their rendezvous reach the ears of her sisters, who plot against her: pretending their days of jealousy are over, the elder two pay a visit to their cadette and invite her for the hammam, a public bath house. While the princess is distracted there, one of her sisters rush to her palace to check on the secret tunnel. Suddenly, the sultan's son begins to traverse the tunnel - made entirely of glass -, and the princess's sister throws a stone at him. Part of the glass tunnel breaks and a shard injures him in the eye. The prince retreats back to his kingdom. The princess returns to her palace to wait for the prince, but, since he does not show up, she suspects something afoul, so she goes to check on the glass tunnel, and finds blood there. The princess realizes her sisters' doing, leaves the palace and meets a beggar woman. They trade clothes and she begins her quest for the prince. She stops to rest by a tree, and overhears the conversations between two pigeons: the ashes of their feathers can cure the prince. After the birds fall asleep, the princess catches and plucks their feathers to prepare the prince's cure. She then goes to the prince's kingdom to give him the remedy.

Sudan 
In a Sudanese tale collected by Ahmed Al-Shahi and F. C. T. Moore with the title Green-Beans, from El-Barsa, a man is married to two wives, the first named Hadariya. He has one daughter by the first wife, named Nayya ('beautiful'), and three daughters by the second. After his first wife dies, Nayya's sister goad her into asking her father for "Green-Beans", the name of the son of seven mother and seven father, and guarded by ants, slaves and lions. Not wanting to disappoint Nayya, and advised by an old woman, the man passes through Green-Beans's defenses and meets the youth. The man explains the situation to Green-Beans, who presents him with three suitcases, the last one with a firka (a striped red thawb). The man gets the third suitcase with the firka with a letter inside, and gives it to his daughter. Nayya reads the letter, which states that Green-Beans would rather have a female slave. The girl then asks the same old woman to be sold as a slave in Green-Beans's home country, which she does. After Nayya is bought by Green-Beans as a slave, she writes him a letter and flees back home. Later, everything is cleared up, and Nayya marries Green-Beans, but her jealous half-sisters, envying her happiness, convince her to ask their brother-in-law how the men in their country can be killed. Despite his reservations, he still answers her question: to kill a seven-headed serpent, grind its flesh and winnow it in a mat. Nayya's half-sisters follow Greeen-Beans's instructions and place the poweder on his mat; the youth becomes sick and has to be taken back home. Meanwhile, Nayya begins a quest of her own and meets an old man that she kills with a pin on his head. She takes his old man's skin and wears it, then stops by a tree, where she overhears two birds talking about the cure for Green-Beans's ailment: their livers and wings. Nayya kills the birds and pounds their organs. In the old man's disguise, she goes to Green-Beans's castle and cures him, demanding in payment his sword and a whip. Nayya returns home and places his objects on a wall, so that, when Green-Beans appears, he sees them and realizes his wife cured him. As the tale continues, Nayya goes with her half-sisters to the desert, and the latter take out the former's eyes and abandon her there, until she is found by a beggar. With Nayya's sewing skills, she weaves enough carpets for the beggar to buy her eyes back. At the end of the tale, Green-Beans visits the beggar, finds his wife, and after learning of his sisters-in-law's misdeeds, kills them.

See also

Cinderella
Diamonds and Toads
The Blue Bird
The Canary Prince
The Enchanted Snake
The Feather of Finist the Falcon
The Green Knight
Prince Sobur

References

External links

"The Three Sisters"

Three Sisters
Female characters in fairy tales
Superstitions
ATU 400-459

de:Verde Prato